The Canary Islands, also known as the Canaries, are a Spanish archipelago located just off the northwest coast of mainland Africa,  west of the border between Morocco and the Western Sahara. The economy is based primarily on tourism, which makes up 32% of the GDP. The Canaries receive about 12 million tourists per year. Construction makes up nearly 20% of the GDP and tropical agriculture, primarily bananas and tobacco, are grown for export to Europe and the Americas.

Companies based in the Canary Islands

 AC Hotel
 Caja General de Ahorros de Canarias
 Coast FM (Tenerife)
 Edificio Bel Air
 Gran Hotel Bahía del Duque Resort
 Las Águilas Jungle Park
 Loro Parque

 Los Roques Restaurante
 Power FM Canary Islands
 Siam Park
 Supermercados Tu Alteza
 Teatro Guimerá
 TV Canaria
 TV Canaria 2
 Woermann Tower
 Spets 24

See also
 Auditorio de Tenerife
 Centro Internacional de Ferias y Congresos de Tenerife
 List of companies of Spain

References

Companies
 
Canary Islands